"Ah Vy, Seni, Moi Seni" (Russian: "Ах Вы, Сени, Мои Сени" lit.: "Ah you, inner porch, my inner porch") is a traditional Russian folk song.

It tells a simple story about a girl who is in love with the young brewer, Vanya, but her strict father forbids them to see each other. The tune itself is a simple one, but capable of embellishment, and for that reason, it is often either the second or third tune taught to a beginning balalaika student. It is often performed by solo female singers.

The song is known from at least the 18th century.

The song became known all over the world from the epic 1968 Soviet film War and Peace (Voina i Mir) based on Leo Tolstoy's novel and directed by Sergei Bondarchuk.The first part of the film includes a scene with Russian soldiers singing that song while marching through an Austrian village.

The song was used in the 2009 French film Coco Chanel & Igor Stravinsky.

Lyrics

References

External links
 YouTube: "Ah Vy, Seni, Moi Seni" in War and Peace

Russian folk songs
1790 songs